Ostrvica may refer to:

 Ostrvica or Ostrovica, a peak of Rudnik (mountain) in Serbia
 Ostrvica (castle) or Ostrovica, the fortified town on Ostrovica peak of Rudnik mountain in Serbia
 Ostrvica, Croatia, a village near Omiš, Croatia
 Ostrvica, Kosovo, a mountain in the disputed region of Kosovo

See also
 Ostrovica